This is a list of some of the people and organisations most frequently or famously used as a source of humour or target of insult by the British satirical magazine Private Eye.  The nicknames coined for them by the magazine have become part of the daily vernacular of Londoners.

The Royal Family
Queen Elizabeth II was often referred to as "Brenda", and the Prince of Wales as "Brian". This is a result of the 1969 BBC documentary Royal Family, after which the magazine gave each member of the Royal Family working class nicknames, as though they were characters in a soap opera. The Duke of Edinburgh was "Keith", Princess Margaret was "Yvonne" and Diana, Princess of Wales was dubbed "Cheryl".

Prime ministers

Harold Macmillan was Prime Minister when the magazine began publication. His popular soubriquet was "Supermac". This nickname was coined in the 1950s when the cartoonist 'Vicky' of the News Chronicle first depicted Macmillan dressed as the comic-book character Superman. The original intention was a put-down, but the image came to be seen as an affectionate portrait in the "you've never had it so good" (a misquote) era. By the time Private Eye began publication, Macmillan had been mistreated by the newspapers for years. He had been parodied in his presence by Peter Cook when he attended a performance of the revue Beyond the Fringe. The pressure of events such as the 1962 Cabinet reshuffle often dubbed the Night of the Long Knives, the 1963 Profumo affair and the controversy surrounding the succession, which involved, principally, R. A. Butler and Quintin Hogg, provided much material for satire and parody.
Sir Alec Douglas-Home, Macmillan's successor, was heavily lampooned after Scottish newspaper The Aberdeen Evening Express accidentally used a photograph of Douglas-Home to illustrate a June 1964 story about a Scottish Baillie named Vass. The "Baillie Vass" episode gave the magazine an initial opening to exploit, but the image of an aristocratic earl who was obviously ill-at-ease on television, then emerging strongly as the primary medium for political communication, made the Prime Minister an easy and regular target. Private Eye thereafter affected to believe that 'Home' had been unmasked as an impostor, a position it maintained until Home's death in 1995.
Harold Wilson was the first elected Prime Minister to receive the Private Eye treatment from scratch, as it were. Calling him "Wislon", partly because of its sinister sound, but mainly to avoid retribution in the libel courts, the Eye portrayed him as a relentless chancer, climber and self-promoter, for whom being Prime Minister was infinitely more important than anything he might achieve in the office. In a retrospective for The Life and Times of Private Eye the editors compared him to David Frost, who was always accused by the Private Eye crowd of sharing these same motivations. Wilson's name tended to be preceded by expressions such as "sensitive", "versatile" and particularly, "pragmatic", suggesting that he would keep changing his positions to please those around him. In later years, after the jailing of the fraudster Emil Savundra, he was referred to as "Wilsundra". One cartoon parodied the horror movie Willard, with a Wilson-faced rat, and the title "Wislard". A major part of Private Eye's assault on Wilson was the celebrated Mrs Wilson's Diary, supposedly the memoirs of his wife, written in the style of the then-popular radio drama series Mrs Dale's Diary. More seriously, some contributors to the magazine, including Auberon Waugh, believed that it was a major outlet for MI5 smears in the 1970s.
Edward Heath gained the nickname "The Grocer" from his role in negotiations over the EEC food policies during the Macmillan/Home administrations. When elected Prime Minister he was portrayed as a hopeless waffler, mostly interested in sailing his yacht Morning Cloud, and ignoring the corruption of colleagues such as Reginald Maudling. Heath's unusual status as a bachelor prime minister also gave rise to homosexual innuendo.
The Falklands War and the high levels of unemployment in 1980s Britain were the two subjects for which Margaret Thatcher received most criticism. She was also the subject of an ironic piece where she was described as "bewitching... sexual and political power combine to create the perfect woman."

Other politicians
Jeffrey Archer, the former Conservative MP for Louth, Lincolnshire, who was Deputy Chairman of the party under Margaret Thatcher and later served time in prison for perjury, is usually referred to as 'Jeffrey Archole' or 'Lord Archhole'. The Eye characterises him as a liar and fantasist, and calls him "The Great Storyteller" (with a double meaning as he is a novelist). On occasion it has published spoofs of Archer's fiction, describing a thinly-veiled heroic version of himself called 'Jeremy Bowman'. The Eye has also occasionally levelled criticism at his wife, the "fragrant" Mary Archer. Eye "diarist" Craig Brown mocked Mary Archer's support for her husband in his version of her writings: "I am the chairman of the Ethics Committee at Addenbrookes hospital, and well used to coming down hard on those who lie incompetently."
Reginald Maudling was one of the Eye's prime targets in the Heath government.  The volume of criticism rose following news about his role in the Real Estate Fund of America, with its connections to the Mafia and even to friends of Richard Nixon. His fondness for fine dining led him to be caricatured as a "bloated voluptuary", usually dressed in a nightshirt and sleeping cap, waking only to eat. The constant sleeping was used as a symbolic motif regarding his perceived inaction over the Ulster situation when he was Home Secretary. A famous photograph in the Eye following Bloody Sunday in 1972 showed Maudling and Defence Secretary Lord Carrington. The 'bubble' caption from Carrington read "Six-and-a-half brace", with Maudling replying "Not bad for the time of year". This item played a part in the flaying which Maudling received in the media and elsewhere over his lethargic handling of the episode.  Another Eye item featured a spoof dictionary and its definition of the verb "maudle" ("to prevaricate, procrastinate etc.").
Ian Paisley (or occasionally his Spitting Image puppet) has featured on the cover of Private Eye several times. He is also referred to on the front cover of Issue 202 (12 September 1969), which showed a young Bernadette Devlin flashing her knickers, the balloon reading "This should get a rise out of Paisley". He is usually referred to in connection with events in Northern Ireland, whether or not he was directly involved in the issues raised. On the 1967 Christmas record The Abominable Radio Gnome, the announcer says, "And now a comment from Father Palsy" (to a Protestant, a gratuitously offensive Catholic mode of address), to which the response, in a camp Ulster accent, is, "Begorrah, bejabers and sod the Pope" (the phrase "sod the Pope" recurs regularly in Private Eye in reference to Paisley). Consistent with the Eye treatment of Mohamed Fayed and his affected name, Private Eye seldom calls Paisley "Reverend" (he is, but only in the Free Presbyterian Church of Ulster, in which the Paisley family has always had the predominant influence) or "Doctor", since his doctorate is an honorary degree awarded by Bob Jones University of South Carolina, a fundamentalist Christian institution in the United States. This is part of a wider Private Eye dislike for Bob Jones University and similar institutions, which it often compares to McDonald's, and calls its principal training establishment Hamburger University.
Margaret Beckett, the former Foreign Secretary, was named Rosa Klebb, after the villain of the James Bond film From Russia With Love, whom she is said to resemble.

Prominent figures
 Lord Goodman, a member of Harold Wilson's close circle, was a favourite target, usually referred to as Lord "Two Dinners" Goodman or Lord Badman. The Eye saw him as a latter-day Cardinal Richelieu, the power behind the throne, especially when the Conservatives held power. From the negotiations over the status of Rhodesia, to his central role in many sources of public money, such as the Arts Council, to the many high-profile lawsuits his firm filed, including those against the Eye itself, the magazine regarded him as the true ruler of the country. One cartoon showed him as a spider at the centre of a web of money and influence. Another demonstrated his apparent role in making sure that money always found its way to the Royal Opera House in Covent Garden, seen as an elite institution catering mainly to the upper crust, when the public money was intended to bring art to the masses. Goodman's obesity and hangdog looks made him easy to ridicule.

Businessmen
Rupert Murdoch is often referred to as "the Dirty Digger".
Richard Desmond is often referred to as 'Dirty' Desmond due to his company, Northern & Shell, owning a number of pornographic magazines and television channels.  
Robert Maxwell (who sued Private Eye several times) was referred to as "Captain Bob" or "Cap'n Bob".
Mohamed Al-Fayed is routinely referred to as "The Phoney Pharaoh" or "Mohamed Al-Fugger".  Much humour is derived from his mispronunciation of the word "fuck" as "fugg", and conspiracy theories concerning the deaths of his son Dodi Al-Fayed and Princess Diana. He is also referred to simply as Mohamed Fayed on the basis that the 'Al-' was added to his name by Fayed himself.
Richard Branson, the Virgin Group entrepreneur is a frequent target for his train services (whose reliability is often called into question) and his capacity for self-publicity. He is usually referred to in the magazine as 'Beardie'.
Barbara, Lady Judge, Chairman Emeritus of the United Kingdom Atomic Energy Authority dubbed as "The Atomic Kitten".

Journalists

Nigel Dempster, a former gossip columnist for the Daily Mail and The Mail on Sunday, received much attention, especially in the Grovel gossip section, including a picture of him in flagrante with an admirer. It was later revealed that he was the major contributor to Grovel at the time. He is referred to in the Eye as "Nigel Pratt-Dumpster", "Humpty Dumpster", or "Former GLE (Greatest Living Englishman) Nigel Dempster".
Peter Hitchens's nickname "Bonkers" was popularised by the Eye.
George Gale, a former journalist, was referred to as George G Ale, as a tribute to his ability to consume alcohol,
Derek Jameson, a former tabloid journalist, was renamed "Sid Yobbo" for the manner of his speech and his populist attitudes.
Paul Johnson, the conservative polemicist and historian, was once a regular target and was referred to as "loonybins". During the Sixties, the US President Lyndon Baines Johnson was dubbed "Loony Bins Johnson", and the nickname has been applied to other Johnsons. Targeting Paul Johnson was once a favourite tactic of deputy editor Francis Wheen, but deprecating references to Johnson predated his involvement in the Eye by some years.
Piers Morgan, former editor of the Daily Mirror, is still a regular target. He is usually referred to as Piers "Morgan" Moron, as if Moron was really his surname, and Morgan merely a nickname.
Andrew Neil, Scottish broadcaster and journalist, is usually referred to as 'Brillo Pad'. For many years from the 1990s, a picture taken of him (wearing a string vest) with a young African American woman featured in nearly every issue, and still appears in the 2020s. The woman in the photograph is Sajata Robinson, an American make-up artist. The woman was falsely assumed to be Pamella Bordes with whom Neil was also linked. The Eye at one time spelt 'Andrew Neill', as he once stated that it annoyed him when people misspell his name, and also alluding to his affair with Ms Bordes, whose first name is similarly written with an unusual number of Ls.
Peregrine Worsthorne, the former editor of The Sunday Telegraph, was consistently referred to as 'Sir Perishing Worthless'.
Peter McKay, a Scottish journalist, was a regular target with variants of a story of his attempts to seduce junior female members of staff. Usually referred to as "McLie" or "McHackey", McKay was the editor of Punch magazine when it was relaunched by Mohamed Fayed as a Private Eye spoiler in 1996. McKay was also a contributor to Private Eye's Grovel column.
Johann Hari has been the subject of the 'Hackwatch' column since 2003. The column documented Hari's threat to sue a contributor to Harry's Place, an internet blog, who accused him of making things up. Hari was later exposed more widely for professionally disgracing himself, which The Independent later confirmed.

Entertainment and media
Lady Antonia Fraser, an acclaimed historian, and widow of Harold Pinter, has won numerous prizes for her best selling biographies. 
Sir Paul McCartney is one of the rock music stars whose activities are most often reported and attributed to "Spiggy Topes" (a generic parody of various ageing rock musicians and their tabloid excesses). In his case the attribution is to "Sir Spigismond Topes".

Newspapers

The Guardian is known as The Grauniad, due to its reputation for misprints. After a rebrand where the paper's logotype became lowercase, this became the grauniad (minus caps). This is one of many Eye nicknames to have transcended into mainstream popular culture.
The Daily Telegraph is either The Torygraph (for its support for the Conservative Party), The Hello!graph (for its sensationalist coverage of vacuous celebrity news), "The Daily Terrorgraph" or The Telavivagraph (for its unwavering support for Israel, particularly the Likud party, and those with a vested interest in Israel, particularly its former proprietor Conrad Black and his wife Barbara Amiel). The Eye coined the name The Maily Telegraph, or The Daily Mailograph, to mark the hiring of a number of ex-Daily Mail employees and a perceived shift towards more tabloid-style content, or the Daily Hellograph, because of its penchant for publishing photographs of attractive young girls.
The Observer is known as The Absurder.
The Daily Express was called the Titsbychristmas in 1978; afterward it became the Daily Getsworse or the Daily Getsmuchworse, and recently the Daily Sexpress, since its owner, Richard 'Dirty' Desmond, also owns or owned several pornographic magazines and satellite pornography channels. Currently the paper is lampooned as The Di-ly Express, due to the perceived obsession of the paper with conspiracy theories regarding Diana, Princess of Wales and her death in 1997, and the volume of weekly, front-page coverage it has devoted to her.
The Independent (widely called the Indy) is described as the Indescribablyboring, while its former sister publication The Independent on Sunday, was known as the Sindie.
The News of the World was known, until its closure in July 2011, as The Screws of the World, The News of the Screws, or simply The Screws.
The Daily Mail is usually spoofed for its obsession with property prices, asylum seekers and scare stories, and is sometimes referred to as The Daily Lie or The Daily Hate-Mail. In one cartoon in 2004 the magazine published a Mail-style, scare-story cartoon of a newspaper whose headline was "what kind of society lets the Daily Mail be published EVERY DAY?"
The Daily Mirror is known as The Moron, a pun both on the Eye'''s nickname for former Mirror editor Piers Morgan (often written as Piers "Morgan" Moron), and former Conservative Chancellor Kenneth Clarke's description of the Mirror as "a paper read by morons" in an education debate in 1988.
 The London Evening Standard is referred to as The Evening Boris due to its support for Boris Johnson, the previous Mayor of London.The Sun has been a regular target for Private Eye, particularly when the daily paper was edited by Kelvin MacKenzie. It is known as The Wapping Liar, a pun on "whopping" and the London borough where it was produced for some years after leaving Fleet Street. One of the most famous of its Sun spoofs was published during the Falklands War in 1982, when it ran a fake Sun'' promotion: "Kill an Argie and win a Metro!" An apparently delighted MacKenzie joked: "Why didn't I think of that?"

See also
Recurring in-jokes in Private Eye

References

Private Eye
Private Eye